Iacopo V Appiani (1480 – 20 October 1545) was the lord of Piombino of the Appiani (or Appiano) dynasty from 1511 until his death.

He was born in Piombino, the son of Iacopo IV Appiani, 1st Prince of Piombino and Princess Victoria Todeschini-Piccolomini. Iacopo V's paternal grandfather was Jacopo III, the 3rd  lord of Piombino and Battistini Kampofregozo and of the daughter of Doge of Genoa Jano I. His maternal grandfather was Antonio, the 1st  Duke of Amalfi from Todeschini-Piccolomini, and of Princess Mary d'Aragona, illegitimate daughter of the Ferdinand the Ist, the King of Naples.

Like his predecessors, he initially allied with the Aragonese of Naples, in his case by marrying Marianna of Aragon in 1510, widow of Roberto II Sanseverino. After Marianna's death, he married Emilia Ridolfi, niece of Pope Leo X; she died soon afterwards, and Jacopo remarried with her sister Clarice. After her death he married a fourth time to Elena Salviati, daughter of Jacopo Salviati and Lucrezia de' Medici.

He is sometimes argued to be the subject of Rosso Fiorentino's Portrait of a Young Man (Berlin). He was succeeded by his son Iacopo VI. His other son Alfonso was admiral in the Navy of the Grand Duchy of Tuscany.

References

Further reading
 Mauro Carrara, Signori e principi di Piombino, Bandecchi & Vivaldi, Pontedera 1996.

Appiani, Iacopo 5
Appiani, Iacopo 5
Iacopo 5
Lords of Piombino
Appiani, Iacopo 5